Jesup is a railroad station in the city of Jesup, Wayne County, Georgia, United States. Located at 176 Northwest Broad Street, the station is currently in use for service on Amtrak's Silver Meteor and bypassed by their Silver Star. Amtrak service began on October 1, 1979, when the Silver Meteor was realigned away from a station on State Route 32 at Thalmann, Georgia.

The station was built in 1899 as part of the Atlantic Coast Line Railroad. In February 2003, the station was damaged in a fire and subsequently boarded up as the town sought funds for restoration. In 2005, Jesup received $836,000 in federal funds after the rehabilitation was designated a High Priority Project under the federal transportation bill. The city also purchased the building and land from CSX Transportation, owner of the adjacent railroad line. The city decided to return the building to its early 20th-century appearance.

The completion of the rehabilitation project was celebrated in October 2012 during the city's annual Arch Festival, an event started in 2003 to highlight the renewed downtown. In addition to a passenger waiting room, the depot now also includes a community meeting space and new offices and a welcome center for the Wayne County Board of Tourism. The interior is decorated with historic photographs and memorabilia that demonstrate the strong ties between Jesup and the railroads. A formal ribbon-cutting ceremony was held on March 8, 2013 and included speeches by the mayor and an Amtrak representative.

Between January 24 and October 14, 2022, the Silver Star temporarily stopped in Jesup due to the suspension Silver Meteor, which is normally the only train that stops at that station. This was due to a resurgence of the Omicron variant of COVID-19 as well as a further delay caused by Hurricane Ian.

References

External links

Jesup Amtrak Station (USA Rail Guide -- Train Web)
Jesup ACL Depot (Georgia's Railway History & Heritage)

Amtrak stations in Georgia (U.S. state)
Atlantic Coast Line Railroad stations
Buildings and structures in Wayne County, Georgia
Transportation in Wayne County, Georgia